Jutta Speidel (born 26 March 1954) is a German actress.

She had her first television role at the age of 15. Jutta Speidel appeared in Schulmadchen Report 1 (1970), which was directed by Ernst Hofbauer and produced by Wolf C. Hartwig. She acted mainly in German television series and TV films like Rivalen der Rennbahn. She is remembered for playing several roles in the very popular TV series Derrick.

She has two daughters. She founded the HORIZONT e.V. charity in 1997 for homeless children and their mothers.

As of 3 November 2012 she is living in Rome, Italy.

Selected filmography
  We'll Take Care of the Teachers (1970)
 Twenty Girls and the Teachers (1971), as Ina
 Morgen fällt die Schule aus (1971), as Lydia Meier
 Our Willi Is the Best (1971), as Biggi Hansen
 The Heath Is Green (1972), as Hanna Engelmann
 Old Barge, Young Love (1973), as Elke Steubels
 The Twins from Immenhof (1973), as Anke
 Blue Blooms the Gentian (1973), as Kuni
 Auch ich war nur ein mittelmäßiger Schüler (1974), as Julia
 The Secret Carrier (1975), as Lisa Hopfen
  (1975, TV film), as Beate Rehberg
  (1977, TV series), as Charlotte Möller
 Bier und Spiele (1977, TV series), as Liz Meier
 Derrick, as Season 5, Episode 6: "Klavierkonzert" (1978, TV), as Helga Kling
  (1978, TV miniseries), as Barbara Grant
 Derrick, as Season 6, Episode 10: "Das dritte Opfer" (1979, TV), as Gabriele Voss
 Fleisch (1979, TV film), as Monica
 Mathias Sandorf (1979, TV miniseries), as Rena Sandorf
 The Rebel (1980), as Vivien
 Derrick, as Season 8, Episode 5: "Die Schwester" (1981, TV), as Doris Menke
  (1981), as Britta Schmidt
 Danny's Dream (1982, TV film), as Sandra
 Dr. Margarete Johnsohn (1982, TV film), as Klara
  (1983), as Julia
 Judgment in Berlin (1988), as Sigrid Radke
 Rivalen der Rennbahn (1989, TV series), as Monika Adler
 Forsthaus Falkenau (1989–1995, TV series), as Silva Baroneß von Bernried
 Kartoffeln mit Stippe (1990, TV miniseries), as Gertrud Gräfin von Retzlow
 Success (1991), as Katharina von Radolny
  (1993), as Luzie
 Alle meine Töchter (1995–2001, TV series), as Margot Sanwaldt
 Um Himmels Willen (2002–2012, TV series), as Lotte Albers
  (2006, TV film), as Hilde Döbbelin
 Donna Roma (2007, TV series), as Frederike Heise
 Aber jetzt erst recht (2010, TV film), as Katharina Pfeiffer
  (2012, TV film), as Jutta Riedl
 Jet Set, Jitters and Jealousy (2013, TV film), as Jutta Riedl
 Two Fools in Sardinia (2015, TV film), as Jutta Riedl
 Club der einsamen Herzen (2019, TV film), as Helga

References

External links

German film actresses
German television actresses
20th-century German actresses
21st-century German actresses
Actresses from Munich
1954 births
Living people
Recipients of the Order of Merit of the Federal Republic of Germany